Michigan District is the name of:

Michigan District (Church of the Brethren)
Michigan District (Lutheran Church–Missouri Synod)
another name for Amtrak's Michigan Line